Portraits of Bob Dylan is the title of Yes guitarist Steve Howe's ninth solo album, released in 1999. The album features his son Dylan Howe on drums and several other guest artists, including (former) Yes band members Jon Anderson and Geoff Downes, performing cover versions of Bob Dylan songs. Keith West, lead singer of the 1960s band Tomorrow (in which Howe was the guitarist), sings lead on "Lay Lady Lay".

Reception
AllMusic reviewer Stewart Mason gave the album 2 stars out of 5, stating "Portraits of Bob Dylan is pleasant enough, and it's a nice gesture toward an obvious hero of Howe's, but it's not even close to essential for either Dylan or Howe fans".

Track listing

Personnel

Musicians 
 Steve Howe – guitar, pedal steel guitar, bass, mandolin, banjo, piano, organ, keyboards, lead and backing vocals
 Dylan Howe – drums
 Geoff Downes – keyboards
 Anna Palm – violin
 Nathalie Manser – cello
 Jon Anderson – lead vocals on 1 
 Annie Haslam – lead vocals on 3 
 Max Bacon – lead vocals on 4
 P. P. Arnold – lead vocals on 6 
 Dean Dyson – lead vocals on 7 
 Keith West – lead vocals on 8
 Phoebe Snow – lead vocals on 9 
 Allan Clark – lead vocals on 11

Production 
 Steve Howe – producer
 Paul Sutin – engineer
 Christophe Suchet – engineer
 Dave Richards – engineer
 Kris Fredriksson – assistant engineer

See also
List of songs written by Bob Dylan
List of artists who have covered Bob Dylan songs

References

Steve Howe (musician) albums
1999 albums
Bob Dylan tribute albums